Heubach is a river of Bavaria, Germany. It flows into the Main at Großheubach.

See also
List of rivers of Bavaria

Rivers of Bavaria
Rivers of Germany